Koraga may refer to:
 Koraga people
 Koraga language